Paul Chadwick (born 1957) is an American comic book creator best known for his series Concrete, about a normal man trapped in a stone body.

Biography
Born in Seattle, Chadwick grew up in its suburb Medina, where his father, Stephen F. Chadwick, was the city attorney. As a teenager, he participated in Apa-5, the amateur press alliance of comics fans, and in 1979 graduated from the Art Center College of Design, where he had majored in illustration.

Chadwick began his career creating storyboards for Disney, Warner Brothers, Lucasfilm and other film studios, contributing to such films as Pee Wee's Big Adventure, Strange Brew, The Big Easy, Ewoks: The Battle for Endor, Lies and Miracle Mile.

He drew issues of the comic book Dazzler, published by Marvel Comics, before creating Concrete, first published by Dark Horse Comics in Dark Horse Presents #1 (July 1986). He wrote Gifts of the Night for DC Comics' Vertigo imprint, with art by John Bolton.

After working on several Matrix comics, Chadwick was asked by the Wachowskis to write the MMORPG The Matrix Online. He outlined the general story direction and offshoots of events in the game. Chadwick also illustrated cards for the Magic: The Gathering collectible card game.

In May 2015, Chadwick announced he is working on a new Concrete series entitled Stars over Sand. In November 2017, he reported he was still at work on the story, describing it as Concrete being "hit by lightning and rendered amnesiac. He discovers the world anew, and, somewhat paranoid, becomes a danger to his loved ones and others."

Awards
Chadwick won the Eisner Award for Best Writer/Artist for 1989, and was nominated for Harvey Awards for Best Artist, Writer, and Writer/Artist that same year.

Bibliography

DC Comics
 Gifts of the Night #1-4 (1998–99)
 Harlan Ellison's 7 Against Chaos graphic novel (2013)
 Y: The Last Man #16-17 (2004)

Dark Horse Comics
 Concrete #1-10 (1987–88)
 Concrete Color Special (1989)
 Concrete: Fragile Creature #1-4 (1991)
 Concrete: The Human Dilemma #1-6 (2004–05)
 Concrete: Killer Smile #1-4 (1994)
 Concrete: Strange Armor #1-5 (1997–98)
 Concrete: Think Like a Mountain #1-6 (1996)
 Star Wars: Empire #9-12, 15 (2003)
 Star Wars: A Valentine Story one-shot (2003)
 The World Below #1-4 (1999)
 The World Below: Deeper and Stranger #1-4 (1999-2000)

Marvel Comics
 Dazzler #38-42 (1985–86)
 Deadpool #46-48 (2000)
 Doctor Strange: The Flight of Bones #3-4 (replaced original artist Tony Harris) (1999)

References

External links
Official Paul Chadwick site
GCD: Paul Chadwick
Interview with Paul Chadwick re: The Matrix Online
Paul Chadwick's interview with the Wachowski Brothers re: The Matrix Online Archived from the original

Comics
Paul Chadwick's comic "Deja Vu", originally for The Matrix website
Paul Chadwick's "Let it All Fall Down", originally for The Matrix website
Paul Chadwick's "The Miller's Tale", originally for The Matrix website

1957 births
Living people
American comics artists
American comics writers
American graphic novelists
Artists from Seattle
Eisner Award winners for Best Writer/Artist
Game artists
Harvey Award winners for Best Cartoonist
Inkpot Award winners
People from Medina, Washington